Pengamuck is a village 32 kilometers from Thrissur in the state of Kerala, India.  The word "pengamuck" literally means place of areca nuts, which are grown in the area.  Kerala's biggest areca market is at Pazhanji, just 2 kilometers from Pengamuck.

References

Villages in Thrissur district